The Divisiones Regionales de Fútbol Femenino are the Spanish women's football regional divisions. They are administered by the Autonomous football federations. The level immediately above is the Primera Nacional. The autonomous regional divisions include:

Divisions

Women's soccer licenses in each autonomous community

Source: 
* Only women's licenses in elite level 
** Licenses in 2013

References

External links
All regional leagues on Futbolme.com

 
3